The De Meones, or de Moenes family were an Anglo-Irish family who originated at East Meon in Hampshire. They moved to Ireland in the late thirteenth century, became substantial landowners in Dublin and Meath, and gave their name to the suburb of Rathmines.

Foundations

The family originally came from the village of East Meon in Hampshire. William de Meones, the first family member of note to live in Ireland, came from England in 1279–80 as a clerk in the entourage of John de Derlington, Archbishop of Dublin. He acted as the Archbishop's executor following his death in 1284, and in that capacity he defended a lawsuit brought by Thomas de Chaddesworth, Dean of St Patrick's Cathedral, for expenses allegedly due to him.

He became Chief Baron of the Irish Exchequer in 1311. He acquired lands in the Manor of St. Sepulchre (in fact it consisted of several manors, comprising much of present-day Dublin city). His estates were known first as Meonesrath, and later as Rathmines i.e. the Rath (ringfort) of de Meones.

Second generation

William died in 1325 and his property passed to his nephew, Gilbert de Meones, a professional soldier. He was Constable of the castles of Arklow, Newcastle Mackynegan and Powerscourt, and was a wealthy landowner. John de Meones was three times Lord Mayor of Dublin, in 1331-2, 1335-6 and 1337-8 and Robert de Meones, a brother of Gilbert, held the same office in 1351-2. The de Meones family intermarried with other leading Dublin city families, notably that of John Le Decer, four times Mayor of Dublin between 1302 and 1326. Le Decer was the maternal grandfather of John de Meones. John's father, another Robert, was a man of considerable wealth, some of which probably came to him through his marriage to Elena Le Decer, John le Decer's daughter.

A John Meones of Ratoath was appointed Keeper of the Peace for  County Meath in 1382. His son Robert Meones, also of Ratoath, living in 1404-7, was a minor Crown official.

Nicholas de Meones and his heirs

Nicholas de Meones (died 1394), who was the son of Robert and nephew of Gilbert de Meones, was appointed a judge of the Court of King's Bench (Ireland) in 1374. During his somewhat turbulent career he was arrested for felony and treason and imprisoned in Dublin Castle, but soon freed. He was also a man of property, who bought three houses on Winetavern Street in Dublin city centre.

In 1382 a second William de Meones was Lord of the Manor of Meonesrath. He was still living in 1399. In 1394 he inherited the estate of his cousin Nicholas, the judge. The family also held lands at Harold's Cross and operated a watermill on the River Dodder, then the main source of Dublin's drinking water. They sold their houses on Winetavern Street in the 1390s to the wealthy Passevaunt family.

Sixteenth century

In the 1520s and 1530s, a third William de Meones was granted further lands in South Dublin: at Cullenswood (now Ranelagh) "beyond the water of the River Dodder", and at Ticknock, in the foothills of the Dublin Mountains. Little is known of the family in later generations.

See also 
Nicholas de Meones
William de Meones
John Le Decer

References

People from East Meon
People from Rathmines
Irish families
History of Dublin (city)